Gulnaz Zhuzbaeva (in Kyrgyz: Гульназ Жузбаева) is a disability rights activist from Kyrgyzstan. She was presented with one the BBC's 100 Women awards in 2020. Formerly head of the Kyrgyz Federation of the Blind, Zhuzbaeva worked as a Braille translator in 2021. She also provides training for people who are visually impaired, as well as their employers. She is also a co-director of the non-governmental organisation Empower Blind People. She has previously studied at the Louisiana Center for the Blind. Public speaking engagements have included: a TEDx talk in Bishkek in 2021; for the United Nations on International Women's Day in 2019, amongst others.

References

External links 

 
 
Гульназ Жузбаева попала в топ-100 самых влиятельных женщин on Mir24

BBC 100 Women
Living people
Year of birth missing (living people)
Kyrgyzstani human rights activists
Disability rights activists
Kyrgyzstani women
Women activists